The Presbyterian Church of Senegal (PCS) - in French Eglise Presbytérienne du Sénégal - is a Reformed Churches appellation Presbyterian in Senegal. It was founded in 2004 by Pastor Moussa Diouf, converted to Christianity through the work of WEC International.

History 

Pastor Moussa Diouf converted to Christianity from World Evangelization for Christ, an international interdenominational mission. In 2004, the pastor founded the Presbyterian Church of Senegal.

Since then, the denomination has grown to reach a total of 20 churches and 800 members in 2017.

As of 2017, the denomination is presided over by Rev. Mamadou Diop.

Inter-church Relations 

The denomination is part of the World Reformed Fellowship. In addition, it receives help from the National Union of Independent Reformed Evangelical Churches of France for the training of pastors and social works.

IPS works to establish a federation with other Presbyterian denominations in West Africa called Presbyterian Churches of West Africa.

References

Presbyterian denominations in Africa
Members of the World Reformed Fellowship